David Davies, 3rd Baron Davies,  (born 2 October 1940), is a British peer and engineer.

Davies is the eldest son of David Davies, 2nd Baron Davies, and Ruth Dugdale, daughter of William Marshall Dugdale. He succeeded in the barony at the age of three after his father was killed in the Second World War. He was educated at Eton and King's College, Cambridge, and later became a chartered engineer. From 1975 to 2000 he was Chairman of the Welsh National Opera.

He spoke four times in the House of Lords during the 1990s, but lost his seat in Parliament after the passing of the House of Lords Act 1999. He was appointed a Deputy Lieutenant of Powys in 1997 and served as Vice-Lord-Lieutenant of the county in 2004.

Lord Davies married Beryl Oliver (1941–2020), daughter of William James Oliver, in 1972. They had two sons and two daughters. His wife served as High Sheriff of Powys 2004–2005. They lived in the family's ancestral home in Llandinam, Plas Dinam, until 2011.

Arms

References

External links

1940 births
Living people
Barons in the Peerage of the United Kingdom
People educated at Eton College
Alumni of King's College, Cambridge
Deputy Lieutenants of Powys
Davies